This is a list of rural localities in the Mari El Republic. Mari El (Respublika Mariy El;;) is a federal subject of Russia (a republic). It is geographically located in the European Russia region of the country, along the northern bank of the Volga River, and is administratively part of the Volga Federal District. The Mari El Republic has a population of 696,459 (2010 Census).

Volzhsky District 
Rural localities in Volzhsky District:

 24 km Gorkovskoy zheleznoy dorogi

Zvenigovsky District 
Rural localities in Zvenigovsky District:

 Kokshaysk

See also 
 
 Lists of rural localities in Russia

References 

Mari El